Arkadiusz Miklosik (born 7 May 1975) is a Polish retired footballer. He is a former sporting director of Warta Poznań.

Career

Club
He announced his retirement on 22 June 2011.

References

External links
 

1975 births
Living people
Polish footballers
Ceramika Opoczno players
KSZO Ostrowiec Świętokrzyski players
Lech Poznań players
Lechia Gdańsk players
Warta Poznań players
Association football midfielders
Footballers from Poznań